Herpetoreas tpser is a species of natricine snake endemic to India.

References

tpser
Reptiles of India
Endemic fauna of India
Reptiles described in 2022